Carl Frederik Wandel (15 August 1843 – 21 April 1930) was a Danish naval officer and polar explorer. He was largely involved in hydrographic work.

Wandel became an officer of the Danish Navy in 1863, rising to the rank of captain in 1892, of Rear Admiral in 1899 and Vice Admiral in 1905. He retired from active service in 1911.

Career
In 1864 Wandel served in the schooner  in the Baltic Sea and in 1865-67 he took part in a French expedition to Mexico. In 1876-78 he was put in charge of the mail ship to Iceland and in 1880 he participated in a US oceanographic survey expedition. In 1881-86 he was Head of the Marine Ministry Secretariat, 1886-88 head of maritime surveys in Danish waters and in 1889-98 director of the Chart-archive. In 1890 Wandel was appointed chairman of the commission for the survey of Danish waters and in 1895 chairman of the commission for geological and geographical studies in Greenland. In the period of 1901-08 he became an official in the Defence Commission. In 1914-27 he was the president of the Royal Danish Geographical Society.

Wandel was regularly deployed as commander, including in 1884 and 1897 commander of the Danish ironclad Helgoland, in 1895 and 1896 as leader of the Ingolf Expedition to Greenland and in 1898 as commander of the frigate HDMS  Fyn to the Mediterranean.

Honours
The Wandel Sea between Greenland and Svalbard, Cape Wandel and the Wandel Land nunatak in Greenland, were named after him.

Works
Maritime Warfare in the Danish and Norwegian waters 1807-14 (1915), 
Danmark og Barbareskerne 1746-1845 (1919), 
Nogle Livserindringer (1923)
The Danish Commerce attempt in the Orient in the eighteenth century. (1927).

See also 
 Arctic exploration
 Cartographic expeditions to Greenland

References

External links
The Danish Ingolf-Expedition - Internet Archive

1843 births
1930 deaths
Royal Danish Navy
Scandinavian explorers of North America
Greenlandic polar explorers
Danish polar explorers
Explorers of the Arctic